Marshalliana bivittata is a moth in the family Cossidae. It is found in Zimbabwe. There are also records from the Democratic Republic of Congo, Ethiopia, Ghana, Eritrea, Kenya and Uganda, but these need confirmation.

References

Natural History Museum Lepidoptera generic names catalog

Metarbelinae
Moths described in 1901